Brazilian Soccer Academy is a football team based in Arecibo, Puerto Rico. The club plays in the Liga Nacional de Fútbol de Puerto Rico, the premier football division of Puerto Rico. The team is sponsored by a youth soccer academy of the same name.

History
The team first joined the Liga Nacional de Fútbol de Puerto Rico in 2014, finishing third in the regular season. In the end-of-season playoffs, they defeated Puerto Rico United in the quarterfinals before falling to eventual champion Yabuco SUAL in the semifinals.

Colors and Name
The team's colors are blue, green, white, and yellow, the same colors used by the Brazil national football team.

References

Football clubs in Puerto Rico
Liga Nacional de Fútbol de Puerto Rico teams